Chang'e is a Chinese moon goddess.

Chang'e may also refer to:

 Chang'e program, China's Chinese Lunar Exploration Program (CLEP):
 Chang'e 1, the first CLEP lunar orbiter, launched on 24 October 2007
 Chang'e 2, the second CLEP orbiter, launched on 1 October 2010
 Chang'e 3, a CLEP lunar lander and rover, launched on 1 December 2013
 Chang'e 4, a CLEP lunar lander and rover, launched on 7 December 2018
 Chang'e 5-T1, a lunar mission launched in 2014
 Chang'e 5, a lunar sample-return mission, launched on 23 November 2020
 Chang'e 6, a lunar mission expected to launch before 2025
 4047 Chang'E, an asteroid.

See also
 Chang (disambiguation)
 Chang-Ngo – a crater on the Moon
 Changez
 Chang'e, a hero in Mobile Legends: Bang Bang